York was a European Parliament constituency covering much of North Yorkshire in England.

Prior to its uniform adoption of proportional representation in 1999, the United Kingdom used first-past-the-post for the European elections in England, Scotland and Wales. The European Parliament constituencies used under that system were smaller than the later regional constituencies and only had one Member of the European Parliament each.

The constituency was created in 1984, incorporating most of the former Yorkshire North constituency and part of Cleveland. It consisted of the Westminster Parliament constituencies of Boothferry, Glanford and Scunthorpe, Harrogate, Ryedale, Scarborough, Selby and York.

Much of the seat became part of the North Yorkshire constituency in 1994, with the remainder going to Humberside. These seats became part of the much larger Yorkshire and the Humber constituency in 1999.

Members of the European Parliament

Results

|- style="background:#f6f6f6;"
! style="background-color: " |
| colspan="2" | New creation:  gain.
| style="text-align:right;"| Swing
| style="text-align:right;"| N/A
||

References

External links
 David Boothroyd's United Kingdom Election Results

European Parliament constituencies in England (1979–1999)
Politics of North Yorkshire
Politics of York
1984 establishments in England
1994 disestablishments in England
Constituencies established in 1984
Constituencies disestablished in 1994